Julidochromis dickfeldi is a species of cichlid endemic to Lake Tanganyika in Africa where it is only known from the southwestern portion.  This species inhabits areas with rock/rubble substrates, each fish maintaining a territory around a crevice or crack.  This species reaches a length of  TL.

Etymology
The specific name honours the German fishkeeper Alf Dickfeld who proposed the expedition on which the type was collected.

See also
List of freshwater aquarium fish species

References

Julidochromis
Taxa named by Wolfgang Staeck
Fish described in 1975
Fish of Lake Tanganyika
Cichlid fish of Africa
Taxonomy articles created by Polbot